Gennadi Viktorovich Remezov (born 19 March 1965) is a former Russian professional footballer.

Club career
He made his professional debut in the Soviet Second League in 1982 for FC Strela Voronezh.

Honours
 USSR Federation Cup winner: 1988.

References

1965 births
Footballers from Voronezh
Living people
Soviet footballers
Russian footballers
Association football midfielders
Russian Premier League players
FC Fakel Voronezh players
FC Kairat players
FC Spartak Tambov players
PFC Krylia Sovetov Samara players
Hapoel Rishon LeZion F.C. players
Beitar Tel Aviv F.C. players
Russian expatriate footballers
Expatriate footballers in Israel
FC Ural Yekaterinburg players
FC Metallurg Lipetsk players